Gabríela Friðriksdóttir (born 1971 in Reykjavík, Iceland) is an Icelandic visual artist, painter and sculptor.

In 2005, she represented Iceland at the Venice Biennale, and she is a previous winner of Iceland's Gudmunda Art Prize (2001). She has also shown at Migros Museum, Zurich; Centre Pompidou, Paris; National Gallery, Reykjavik; Museum of Modern Art, Oslo; and Kunsthaus Graz.

Friðriksdóttir has had several solo exhibitions including 'Crepusculum' at Schirn Kunsthalle Frankfurt n 2011, 'Inner Life of a Hay-bale' at Gallery Gamma, Reykjavík, Iceland, in 2016, and 'GABRIELA' at Hverfisgallery, Reykjavík, Iceland in In 2018.

She is also known for her collaboration with the Icelandic musician and superstar Björk.  The two have collaborated on Björk's 2002 CD box set Family Tree and on the 2005 video for Björk's song "Where is the Line" from the album Medúlla. The two also combined their multimedia efforts at the 2005 La Biennale di Venezia in Venice, Italy.

Her work has been associated with New Gothic Art.

References

External links
Website of Gabríela Friðriksdóttir
Interview with Gabríela Friðriksdóttir 

1971 births
Living people
21st-century Icelandic women artists
Icelandic painters
Icelandic sculptors
People from Reykjavík
Icelandic women painters
Icelandic women sculptors
Icelandic contemporary artists